The Keurbooms River is a river in the Western Cape Province in South Africa. The river has its sources south of Uniondale in the Langkloof and flows in a roughly southeastern direction. It passes De Vlugt and the Prince Alfred Pass, flowing along the northern side of the R340 road then it turns south. After crossing the N2 road, it flows into the Indian Ocean through the Keurbooms Estuary, located close to the coastal town of Plettenberg Bay.

The Keurbooms River is approximately 85 km long with a catchment area of 1,080 km2. Its main tributary is the Bitou (Bietou).

Ecology
The Keurbooms River marks the eastern limit of the area inhabited by the Cape galaxias (Galaxias zebratus), a South African fish species endemic to the Cape Floristic Region. It shares the same habitat as imported trouts and lives in an area between the Keurbooms and the Olifants River. Although in South Africa this relatively delicate fish is only classified as near threatened, in Australia species of the same genus were driven to extinction by competing salmonids.

See also 
Keurboomsrivier (settlement)
Keurboomstrand
 List of rivers of South Africa
List of estuaries of South Africa
Drainage basins of South Africa

References

External links

Keurbooms River Nature Reserve Complex Management Plan 
Cape Galaxias (Galaxias zebratus)
Invasion biology
A preliminary assessment of the impact of alien rainbow trout (Oncorhynchus mykiss) on indigenous fishes of the upper Berg River, Western Cape Province, South Africa

Rivers of the Western Cape